"The Second Time Around" is a song with words by Sammy Cahn and music by Jimmy Van Heusen. It was introduced in the 1960 film High Time, sung by Bing Crosby with Henry Mancini conducting his orchestra, and was nominated for the Academy Award for Best Original Song. It lost out to "Never on Sunday".

Its theme is captured by its first two lines:

Although Crosby recorded it on August 25, 1960, for MGM Records, it is especially associated with Frank Sinatra, who recorded it for Reprise Records on December 21, 1960. This achieved some chart success reaching the #50 position in the Billboard Hot 100 chart. Sinatra also recorded it again for Reprise on November 5, 1961, and April 29, 1963.

Jane Morgan sang the song on a 1961 episode of The Jack Benny Program.

Dame Kiri Te Kanawa performed this with André Previn on Kiri Sidetracks: The Jazz Album (1992).

Recorded versions 
 Basin Street East Proudly Presents Miss Peggy Lee, Peggy Lee, 1961
 Let's Face the Music, Shirley Bassey, 1962
 This Time It's Love, The Hi-Lo's, 1962
 You're Mine You, Sarah Vaughan, 1962
 Moon River and Other Great Movie Themes, Andy Williams, 1962
 Love Letters, Julie London, 1962
 Ahmad Jamal at the Blackhawk, Ahmad Jamal, 1962
 Hollywood – My Way, Nancy Wilson, 1963
 Make Mine Swedish Style, Monica Zetterlund & Bill McGuffie Quartet, 1964
 More 4 Freshmen and 5 Trombones, The Four Freshmen, 1964
 Ellington '65, Duke Ellington, 1965
 Loads of Love, Shirley Horn, 1965
 Shirley Bassey at the Pigalle, Shirley Bassey, 1965
 That's All, Mel Tormé, 1965
 The Movie Song Album, Tony Bennett, 1966
 The Dealer, Chico Hamilton, 1966
 Woman Talk, Cleo Laine, 1966
 Grandes Exitos del Cine de los Años 60, Connie Francis, 1967
 Dusty... Definitely, Dusty Springfield, 1968
 Quintessence, Bill Evans, 1976
 It Only Happens Every Time, Monica Zetterlund & The Thad Jones / Mel Lewis Orchestra, 1977
 Rosemary Clooney Sings the Music of Jimmy Van Heusen, Rosemary Clooney, 1986
 Pop Pop, Rickie Lee Jones, 1993
 Manilow Sings Sinatra, Barry Manilow, 1998
 Romance on Film, Romance on Broadway, Michael Feinstein,  2000
 The Movie Album, Barbra Streisand, 2003
 Bolton Swings Sinatra, Michael Bolton, 2006
 Ballads from the Midnight Hotel, Todd Gordon (2007)

Frank Sinatra albums 
 Sinatra's Sinatra, 1963
 A Man and His Music, 1965
 Sinatra & Sextet: Live in Paris, 1994, recorded 1962

References

1960 songs
Songs with lyrics by Sammy Cahn
Songs with music by Jimmy Van Heusen
Frank Sinatra songs
Bing Crosby songs
Dusty Springfield songs
Shirley Bassey songs
Barbra Streisand songs
Michael Bolton songs
Andy Williams songs
Songs written for films